Ian Douglas Woodley (born 20 August 1963) is a former New Zealand field hockey goalkeeper. He was a member of the New Zealand men's hockey team that finished in eighth position at the 1992 Summer Olympics in Barcelona.

References

External links
 

1963 births
Living people
People from Temuka
New Zealand male field hockey players
Field hockey players at the 1992 Summer Olympics
Olympic field hockey players of New Zealand
Sportspeople from Canterbury, New Zealand